Philippe Emile François Gille (10 December 1831 – 19 March 1901) was a French dramatist and opera librettist, who was born and died in Paris.  He wrote over twenty librettos between 1857 and 1893, the most famous of which are Massenet's Manon and Delibes'  Lakmé.

Although Gille studied law and was a clerk for a time at the Préfecture de la Seine, he became secretary of the Théâtre Lyrique then from 1869 an art and music critic for Le Figaro.

Gille was elected to the Académie des beaux-arts in 1899.

Librettos by Philippe Gille
Jacques Offenbach
Vent du soir, ou L'horrible festin (1857)
Le carnaval des revues (1860)
Jeanne qui pleure et Jean qui rit (1864)
Les bergers (1865)
Pierrette et Jacquot (1876)
Le docteur Ox (1877)
Léo Delibes
Monsieur de Bonne-étoile (1860)
Le serpent à plumes (1864)
Jean de Nivelle (1880)
Lakmé (1883)
Kassya (1893)
Robert Planquette
Rip van Winkle (1882)
Jules Massenet
Manon (1884)

References

External links
 

1831 births
1901 deaths
19th-century French male writers
French opera librettists
19th-century French dramatists and playwrights
French male dramatists and playwrights